Sean Goldberg (or Shon, ; born 13 June 1995) is an Israeli footballer who plays as a center-back or as a left-back for Israeli Premier League club Maccabi Haifa and the Israel national team.

Early life
Goldberg was born in Tel Aviv, Israel, to a family of Ashkenazi Jewish and of Sephardi Jewish (Italian-Jewish) descent.

He also holds an Italian passport, on account of his Sephardi Jewish (Italian-Jewish) ancestry, which eases the move to certain European football leagues.

He has graduated from the Reichman University (formerly the IDC Herzliya college) in Herzliya, Israel, in May 2022, majoring in business administration.

Club career

Born in 1995, Goldberg started his football career with Israeli side Maccabi Tel Aviv youth team. On 1 July 2014, he was called up for Maccabi Tel Aviv football team. On 26 October 2014, Goldberg made his senior Israeli Premier League debut against Hapoel Acre, coming on as a substitute for Sheran Yeini at the 75th minute. Goldberg won the 2014–15 Toto Cup Al with Maccabi Tel Aviv.

On February 3, 2015, Goldberg was loaned together with Ben Reichert to Hapoel Tel Aviv, as part of a deal in which Gili Vermouth was signed by Maccabi. On February 14, 2015, Goldberg made his debut for the club, coming in as a substitute in a 0–1 loss to Hapoel Be'er Sheva. He made nine appearances for the club in that season.

On September 1, 2015, Goldberg moved to Bnei Yehuda Tel Aviv on loan until the end of 2016-17 season. In May 2017 he won the Israel State Cup with Bnei Yehuda Tel Aviv, after beating Maccabi Tel Aviv in the final.

On September 4, 2017, he joined Beitar Jerusalem on loan for one season. A week later he made his debut for the club after coming in as a substitute in 2–1 victory over Maccabi Petah Tikva. Goldberg and Beitar finished the 2017–2018 season as the Israel State Cup runners-up after losing 1–3 to Hapoel Haifa in the final.

In the start of the 2018–19 season, Goldberg made a single appearance for Maccabi Tel Aviv in the 2014–15 Toto Cup Al. On August 14, 2019, he was released from Maccabi Tel Aviv and signed with Hapoel Haifa for one season.

On June 11, 2019, Goldberg signed with Hapoel Be'er Sheva. He made his debut for the club in the starting roster in a 1–1 draw against KF Laçi in the 2019–20 Europa League qualifiers, and assisted the goal which his team scored.
In 2020 Goldberg extended his contract with the club for another season. On September 18 made the assist for his team's winning goal in a 2–1 victory against KF Laçi in the 2020–21 Europa League qualifiers, helping his team qualify to the next round.

On June 10, 2021, Goldberg signed with Maccabi Haifa for 2 seasons. He made his debut for the club in a 0–2 loss to FC Kairat in the 2021–22 UEFA Champions League qualifiers. On August 29 he made his league debut for the club in a 0–0 draw against Hapoel Hadera. At the end of the 2021–22 season he won the league championship and finished as runners-up in the Israel State Cup with Maccabi Haifa after losing to Hapoel Be'er Sheva in the final.

International career

Goldberg was internationally capped for his native Israel at all the various youth teams: under-16, under-17, under-18, under-19, and the under-21.

On 17 March 2022, Goldberg was first called up to the Israel senior team, ahead of the friendly matches against Germany and Romania. On March 26, he made his senior debut for the Israel, opening in the 0–2 friendly away loss against Germany.

Career statistics

Club

Honours
Maccabi Tel Aviv
 Israeli Premier League: 2014–15
 Israel Toto Cup (Ligat Ha'Al): 2014–15

Bnei Yehuda Tel Aviv
Israel State Cup: 2016–17

Maccabi Haifa
 Israeli Premier League: 2021–22
 Israel Toto Cup (Ligat Ha'Al): 2021–22
 Israel Super Cup: 2021

See also 

 List of Jewish footballers
 List of Jews in sports
 List of Israelis

References

1995 births
Living people
Footballers from Tel Aviv
Israeli people of Italian-Jewish descent
Citizens of Italy through descent
Israeli Ashkenazi Jews
Israeli Sephardi Jews
Italian Ashkenazi Jews
Italian Sephardi Jews
Israeli footballers
Italian footballers
Jewish footballers
Association football defenders
Association football central defenders
Reichman University alumni
Israel youth international footballers
Israel under-21 international footballers
Israel international footballers
Maccabi Tel Aviv F.C. players
Hapoel Tel Aviv F.C. players
Bnei Yehuda Tel Aviv F.C. players
Beitar Jerusalem F.C. players
Hapoel Haifa F.C. players
Hapoel Be'er Sheva F.C. players
Maccabi Haifa F.C. players
Israeli Premier League players